The European route E98 or E98 is a European road running from Topboğazi in Turkey to the border with Syria.

General 
The European road E98 is a Class A West-East connection road and connects the Turkish city Topboğazi with the border of Syria which makes it at a length of approximately 58 kilometers. The route has been recorded by the UNECE as follows: Topboğazi - Kırıkhan - Reyhanlı - Cilvegözü - Syria.

Route 

: Topboğazı - Kırıkhan
: Kırıkhan - Reyhanlı - Cilvegözü

 
 Motorway 45: Bab al-Hawa

References

External links 
 UN Economic Commission for Europe: Overall Map of E-road Network (2007)

98
E098